Michael Gregory Rabelo (born January 17, 1980) is a former Major League Baseball catcher who played with the Detroit Tigers and Florida Marlins from 2006 to 2008. He is currently the Third Base Coach and Major League Field Coordinator for the Pittsburgh Pirates.

Amateur career
A native of New Port Richey, Florida, Rabelo and attended Ridgewood High School. Following his senior year of high school in 1998, Rabelo was drafted in the 13th round of the Major League Baseball amateur draft by the Boston Red Sox. He did not sign, however, instead choosing to play collegiate baseball for the University of Tampa Spartans. In 2000, he played collegiate summer baseball with the Hyannis Mets of the Cape Cod Baseball League. Following his junior season of college, the Detroit Tigers signed Rabelo after selecting him in the 4th round of the 2001 MLB Draft.

Professional career

Detroit Tigers
Rabelo began his career with the Single-A Oneonta Tigers of the New York–Penn League, where he was named an all star at catcher.  He later played for the Single-A West Michigan Whitecaps in 2002 and 2003; the Single-A Lakeland Flying Tigers in 2004; the Double-A Erie SeaWolves in 2004, 2005, and 2006; and the Triple-A Toledo Mud Hens to finish out the 2006 season. During his time in the minors, Rabelo developed a reputation as a personal catcher for pitcher Joel Zumaya. Rabelo was added to the Tigers 40-man roster in September 2006, and made his debut the same month.

Rabelo began the 2007 season third on the Tigers catching depth chart behind established veterans Iván Rodríguez and backup Vance Wilson. During spring training, Wilson experienced elbow pain, and later learned he would have to undergo Tommy John surgery. As a result, Rabelo began the season on the 25-man active roster, and generally played well, maintaining a batting average that surpassed his minor league average of .263. He hit his first major league home run on September 30, 2007, the last game of the season off Mike MacDougal of the Chicago White Sox.

Florida Marlins
On December 5, 2007, the Tigers traded Rabelo, Andrew Miller, Cameron Maybin, Dallas Trahern, Eulogio De La Cruz and Burke Badenhop to the Florida Marlins for Dontrelle Willis and Miguel Cabrera. In November 2009, Rabelo was granted free agency by the Florida Marlins.

Second Stint with Tigers
On January 14, 2010, Rabelo signed a minor league contract with the Detroit Tigers with an invite to spring training.  He was optioned to the Toledo Mud Hens of the International League, where he was the second string catcher behind Robinzon Diaz.

On July 19, 2010, he was released, after batting .143 with one home run and eight RBIs.

Coaching career
Rabelo was the hitting coach for the Gulf Coast League Tigers and the Short season A Connecticut Tigers. He was hired as manager of the Connecticut Tigers for the 2014 season. On October 20, 2016, Rabelo was promoted to the West Michigan Whitecaps managerial position.
On November 7, 2017, Rabelo was promoted to the Lakeland Flying Tigers managerial positsion for the 2018 season. On December 13, 2018, Rabelo was promoted again as the Erie SeaWolves' manager.  In January 2020 Rabelo was hired by the Pittsburgh Pirates as their Major League assistant hitting coach and in January 2021 he was named as their Major League Field Coordinator. In November 2021 the Pirates announced that Rabelo would be their third base coach in addition to his field coordinator duties.

Personal life
Mike currently resides in Florida with his wife Erin and their two daughters.

References

External links

1980 births
Detroit Tigers players
Florida Marlins players
Living people
Albuquerque Isotopes players
Major League Baseball catchers
Baseball players from Florida
Tampa Spartans baseball players
Hyannis Harbor Hawks players
Azucareros del Este players
Erie SeaWolves players
Gulf Coast Marlins players
Jupiter Hammerheads players
Lakeland Tigers players
Oneonta Tigers players
Phoenix Desert Dogs players
Tigres del Licey players
Toledo Mud Hens players
West Michigan Whitecaps players
American expatriate baseball players in the Dominican Republic